XHTML Basic is an XML-based structured markup language primarily used for simple (mainly handheld) user agents, typically mobile devices.

XHTML Basic is a subset of XHTML 1.1, defined using XHTML Modularization including a reduced set of modules for document structure, images, forms, basic tables, and object support. XHTML Basic is suitable for mobile phones, PDAs, pagers, and settop boxes.

It has replaced WML and C-HTML as more compliant user agents have been developed.

One large advantage XHTML Basic has over WML and C-HTML is that XHTML Basic pages can be rendered differently in web browsers and on handhelds, without the need for two different versions of the same page.

The initial specification had been released in 2000. In 2006, the specification was revised to version 1.1. Six new features have been incorporated into the language in order to better serve the small-device community. The latest supersedition of the specification held by the W3C has been performed in 2018.

DOCTYPE
To validate as XHTML Basic, a document must contain the following Document Type Declaration, or DOCTYPE:
<!DOCTYPE html PUBLIC "-//W3C//DTD XHTML Basic 1.1//EN""http://www.w3.org/TR/xhtml-basic/xhtml-basic11.dtd">

A complete valid and well-formed example is:
<?xml version="1.0" encoding="UTF-8"?>
<!DOCTYPE html PUBLIC "-//W3C//DTD XHTML Basic 1.1//EN"
    "http://www.w3.org/TR/xhtml-basic/xhtml-basic11.dtd">
<html xmlns="http://www.w3.org/1999/xhtml" xml:lang="en">
  <head>
    <title>Hello</title>
  </head>
  <body>
    <p>Hello <a href="http://example.org/">world</a>.</p>
  </body>
</html>

Served with a MIME type of "application/xhtml+xml".

XHTML-Print
XHTML-Print, which became a W3C Recommendation in September 2006, is a specialized version of XHTML Basic designed for documents printed from information appliances to low-end printers.

See also
XHTML
List of document markup languages
Comparison of document markup languages

External links
XHTML Basic
 An Overview of Mobile Versions of XHTML
 W3C Mobile Web Best Practices (for XHTML Basic 1.1)

References

XHTML
World Wide Web Consortium standards